The Great Reward is a 1921 American drama film serial directed by and starring Francis Ford. The film is considered to be lost. The film serial had the working title The Gates of Doom. Philip Ford is the son of director and lead actor Francis Ford.

Cast
 Francis Ford as The American Adventurer
 Ella Hall as The Princess
 Carl Gerard
 Philip Ford (credited as Phil Ford)
 Mark Fenton
 Olive Valerie (credited as Valeria Olivo)

Chapter titles
His Living Image
The Life Current
In Bondage
The Duel
The Madman
Caves of Doom
Burning Sands
The Thunderbolt
Cross Fires
Forgotten Halls
On the Brink
At Bay
The Silent Hour
High Treason
The Reward

See also
 List of film serials
 List of film serials by studio
 List of lost films

References

External links

1921 films
1921 drama films
American silent serial films
American black-and-white films
Films directed by Francis Ford
Lost American films
Silent American drama films
1921 lost films
Lost drama films
1920s American films